Mae Tam is a village and tambon (subdistrict) of Phaya Mengrai District, in Chiang Rai Province, Thailand. In 2005 it had a population of 5026 people. The tambon contains 11 villages. To the southwest is Cham Tong Lake, also known as Mae Tam Reservoir.

References

Tambon of Chiang Rai province
Populated places in Chiang Rai province